The 1st constituency of Indre is a French legislative constituency in the Indre département.

From 1958 to 2012, it was one of three constituencies in Indre.
In the 2010 redistricting, the number of constituencies in Indre was reduced to two.
The first constituency from 2012 consists of the following cantons (partial cantons noted in brackets)
Ardentes (1/12 communes), Le Blanc, Buzançais, Châteauroux-1 (1 commune + part of Châteauroux), Châteauroux-2, Châteauroux-3 and Saint-Gaultier (32/34 communes).

Deputies

Election results

2022

 
 
 
 
 
 
|-
| colspan="8" bgcolor="#E9E9E9"|
|-

2017

2012

References

1